Schizoceratomyia is a genus of hoverflies, with four known species. Larvae are found in ant nests. They are native to the Neotropics.

Species
S. barretoi Carrera, Lopes & Lane, 1947
S. carrerai (Papavero, 1962)
S. flavipes Carrera, Lopes & Lane, 1947
S. malleri (Curran, 1947)

References

Hoverfly genera
Microdontinae
Diptera of South America